The Powerless Rise is the fifth studio album by American metalcore band As I Lay Dying. The album was released on May 7, 2010 in Europe, and on May 11, 2010 in the United States. The Powerless Rise debuted at No. 10 on the Billboard 200 with sales of 38,000. The album features three singles: "Beyond Our Suffering", "Parallels", and "Anodyne Sea". Music videos have been released for all three, with the latest one ("Beyond Our Suffering") consisting of live footage. The album title is taken from their lyric of the song ("Upside Down Kingdom").

Writing and recording 
As I Lay Dying began writing songs for The Powerless Rise in mid-2009 following two years of touring for the band's 2007 album An Ocean Between Us. By the end of September, the group had finished "about 6-7" songs and was scheduled to enter the studio on October 17, 2009 where they would continue to write new songs. This is in contrast to previous albums by As I Lay Dying that had been written over the course of only a few months. The three years between the release of An Ocean Between Us and The Powerless Rise previously was the largest gap between releases from the band at that time. Frontman Tim Lambesis stated that while some bands "need to rush out a crappy record so they can start touring again to pay their bills," As I Lay Dying had been working hard to "make a record worth listening to (hopefully), and start touring again when we're done."

The Powerless Rise was produced by Killswitch Engage lead guitarist Adam Dutkiewicz and Daniel Castelman, and was mixed by Colin Richardson and Martyn Ford. Adam Dutkiewicz also produced As I Lay Dying's An Ocean Between Us. According to guitarist Phil Sgrosso, Dutkiewicz was chosen over ten other producers the band had talked with after "realizing that Adam understands our sound better than most." Castelman and Richardson were also audio engineers on An Ocean Between Us.

Reception 

The record was released in May 2010, to generally positive acclaim. The Powerless Rise currently holds "universal acclaim" status for generally good reviews on Metacritic with an 81 out of 100.

Track listing

Personnel 
Production and performance credits are adapted from the album liner notes.

As I Lay Dying
 Tim Lambesis – lead vocals
 Nick Hipa – lead guitar, backing vocals
 Phil Sgrosso – rhythm guitar, backing vocals
 Josh Gilbert – bass, clean vocals
 Jordan Mancino – drums

Production
 Adam Dutkiewicz – production, engineering
 Daniel Castleman – engineering, pre-production
 Joseph McQueen – vocal engineering
 Colin Richardson – mixing
 Martyn "Ginge" Ford – mix engineer
 Ted Jensen – mastering
 Kelly Cairns – pre-production
 Joey St. Lucas – guitar tech
 Mike Catalano – drum tech, additional percussion
 Jacob Bannon – artwork, design

Charts

References 

2010 albums
Albums produced by Adam Dutkiewicz
Albums with cover art by Jacob Bannon
As I Lay Dying (band) albums
Metal Blade Records albums